The year 1757 in music involved some significant compositions.

Events
 None listed

Classical music
Thomas Arne – 7 Trio Sonatas, Op. 3
Carl Philipp Emanuel Bach 
Keyboard Sonata in D minor, H.38
Fugue in A major, H.101
Keyboard Sonata in D minor, H.105
Keyboard Sonata in G major, H.119
L'Auguste, H.122
La Xénophone et La Sybille, H.123
 Georg Benda – 6 Harpsichord Sonatas
 Anna Bon – 6 Harpsichord Sonatas, Op. 2
 Louis-Claude Daquin – Livre de Noëls
Johann Friedrich Fasch – Serenata Fwv B: 4 \ Beglückter Tag (written for the birthday of Catherine the Great)
Carl Heinrich Graun – Te Deum, GraunWV B:VI:2
George Frideric Handel –  The Triumph of Time and Truth
Joseph Haydn – String Quartets, Op.2 (written between 1757 and 1762)
Johann Gottlieb Janitsch – Sonata da Camera in D major, Op.5
 Leopold Mozart – Concerto for Trombone in G major
Charles Noblet – 
Giovanni Battista Serini 
Keyboard Sonata in B-flat major
Keyboard Sonata in C major
Keyboard Sonata in E major
 Georg Philipp Telemann – Lyksalig Tvillung-Rige!, TWV 12:10

Opera
Florian Leopold Gassmann — Merope
Pietro Alessandro Guglielmi — Lo solachianello imbroglione
Niccolò Jommelli — Temistocle
Jean-Philippe Rameau – L'enlèvement d'Adonis
Giuseppe Scarlatti — La clemenza di Tito
Tommaso Traetta – Didone abbandonata

Methods and theory writings 

 Giovanni Batista Martini – Storia della musica
 Friedrich Wilhelm Marpurg 
 Anfangsgründe der theoretischen Musik (Leipzig: Johann Gottlob Immanuel Breitkopf)
 Handbuch bey dem Generalbasse und der Composition (Berlin: Gottlieb August Lange)
 Nicolo Pasquali – Thorough-Bass Made Easy
 Jean-Philippe Rameau – Réponse de M. Rameau à MM. les éditeurs de l'Encyclopédie sur leur dernier avertissement

Births
 January 28 – Antonio Bartolomeo Bruni, composer (died 1821)
 January 29 – Lazare Rameau, composer (died 1794)
 February 17 – Antonio Calegari, composer (died 1828)
 April 22 – Alessandro Rolla, violinist, composer and music teacher (died 1841)
 May 27 – Caroline von Brandenstein, composer (died 1813)
 June 18 – Ignaz Pleyel, composer and piano-maker (died 1831)
 August 21 – Joseph Franz Ratschky, librettist (died 1810)
 September 6 – August Friedrich Ernst Langbein, German humorist and lyricist (died 1835)
 November 28 – William Blake, poet and lyricist (died 1827)
 date unknown
 Osip Kozlovsky, composer (died 1831)
 Alessandro Pepoli, librettist (died 1796)

Deaths
 February 11 – Mauro D’Alay, composer and violinist (born 1687)
 February 25 – Paolo Benedetto Bellinzani, composer (born c. 1690)
 March 20 – Johann Paul Kunzen, composer (born 1696)
 March 27 – Johann Stamitz, violinist and composer (born 1717)
 July 23 – Domenico Scarlatti, composer (born 1685)
 August 11 – Jose Pradas Gallen, composer
 September 28 – Andrea Zani, violinist and composer (born 1696) (carriage accident)
 October 11 – Zacharias Hildebrandt, organ builder (born 1688)
 November 8 – Pierre Prowo, composer
date unknown
Lodovico Filippo Laurenti, composer (born 1693)
Balthasar Siberer, organ teacher (born 1679)
probable – Jean-Baptiste Masse, cellist and composer (born c. 1700)

 
18th century in music
Music by year